Anguilliformity is a morphological pattern in fishes, named for and typified by the eels. Anguilliform fish have a long, slender body, and travel by anguilliform motion. The caudal fin is often emphasized, with the other fins reduced, absent, or fused with the caudal fin.  Anguilliformity has evolved independently in many groups, including among others:

 Anguilliformes, the eels
 Synbranchiformes, the swamp eels
 Clariidae, the airbreathing catfishes
 Dipnoi, the lungfishes
 Cobitidae, the loaches
 Gymnotidae, the knifefishes, including the electric eel Electrophorus electricus

References 

Fish anatomy